Aeshna verticalis, the green-striped darner,  is a species of dragonfly in the family Aeshnidae. It is typically found in northeastern United States and southern Ontario, Quebec, and New Brunswick. The green-striped darner has an IUCN conservation status of "Least Concern" with a stable population.

Description
Length 7.6 cm (3 in). Similar to A. canadensis  but lateral thoracic stripes are all green. Obtusely notched with wide dorsal posterior extension. Some markings may be green in female.

The green-striped darner has an IUCN conservation status of "Least Concern" with a stable population.

Similar species
 Aeshna canadensis – Canada darner

References

External links
Aeshna verticalis, Iowa Odonata Survey
Green-striped Darner, NJodes
Darner Dragonflies, PBase

Aeshnidae
Insects described in 1861
Taxa named by Hermann August Hagen